Robert Clyde "Dutch" Holland (October 12, 1903 – June 16, 1967) was a Major League Baseball outfielder who played for three seasons. He played for the Boston Braves from 1932 to 1933 and the Cleveland Indians in 1934.

Holland attended North Carolina State College, where he played college baseball for the Wolfpack from 1923–1925.

In 102 games over three seasons (1932-'34), Holland posted a .273 batting average (86-for-315) with 37 runs, 26 doubles, 3 home runs, 34 RBI and 28 bases on balls. He finished his career with a .969 fielding percentage playing at left and right field.

References

External links

1903 births
1967 deaths
Major League Baseball outfielders
Baseball players from North Carolina
Boston Braves players
Cleveland Indians players
NC State Wolfpack baseball players